Sea urchin injuries are caused by contact with sea urchins, and are characterized by puncture wounds inflicted by the animal's brittle, fragile spines.

Process 
Sea urchin spines can be venomous or cause infection. Granuloma and staining of the skin from the natural dye inside the sea urchin can also occur. Breathing problems may indicate a serious reaction to toxins in the sea urchin.

Following injury by a non-venomous sea urchin, the spine can stay for a while inside the flesh, causing pain and discomfort. The spines dissolve after a time, or are expelled from the body.

Additional images

See also 
 Bristleworm sting
 List of cutaneous conditions

References 

Parasitic infestations, stings, and bites of the skin
Echinoidea
Invertebrate attacks